TJH87 are a Finnish electronic music duo consisting of Timo Juuti and Hector 87, founded in 2010. TJH87 are recognized for incorporating a lot of disco and rock music influences into their own unique brand of house music.

Discography

EPs 
 "Woo Chicks & Disco Wobblez" (2012)
 "Break Away Kicks!" (2012)
 "Deadlock" (2013)
 "Good Life (Feat. Gamble & Burke)" (2014)

Singles 
 "Something About Cats" (2011)
 "Suit Up" (2011)
 "ET is PT" / "Every Bla Bla" (2011)
 "I Know It" (2011)

Remix 
 Avicii – Sweat Dreams (Timo Juuti & Hector 87 Remix) (2011)
 Yanik Coen – Rain or Shine (Timo Juuti & Hector 87 Remix) (2011)
 Mr. Root – I Will Not Play R. (Timo Juuti & Hector 87 Remix) (2012)
 ARESS – Reunion (Timo Juuti & Hector 87 Remix) (2012)
 Joonas Hahmo – Sahailua (Timo Juuti & Hector 87 Remix) (2012)
 Combostar feat. Mani Hoffman – Free (Timo Juuti & Hector 87 Remix) (2012)
 Ridney – Appetizer (Timo Juuti & Hector 87 Remix) (2012)
 Satellite Stories – Kids Aren't Safe In The Metro (TJH87 Remix) (2013)
 Bad Boy Bill & DJ Bam Bam feat. Miss Palmer – Looking For Something (TJH87 Remix) (2013)

References

External links 
 TJH87 Beatport

Finnish electronic music groups
Musical groups established in 2010
Finnish musical duos
2010 establishments in Finland